Michail Kletcherov; born in Bansko on ) is a Bulgarian biathlete.

He competed in the 2010 Winter Olympics for Bulgaria. His best finish was 16th, as a member of the Bulgarian relay team. His best individual performance was 44th, in the pursuit.

As of February 2013, his best performance at the Biathlon World Championships, is 9th, in the 2013 mixed relay. His best individual performance in a World Championships is 27th, in the 2012 individual.

As of February 2013, his best Biathlon World Cup finish is 11th, achieved in two men's relay events and one mixed relay. His best individual finish is 13th, in the mass start at Antholz in 2011/12. His best overall finish in the Biathlon World Cup is 47th, in 2011/12.

References 

1982 births
Biathletes at the 2010 Winter Olympics
Biathletes at the 2014 Winter Olympics
Bulgarian male biathletes
Living people
Olympic biathletes of Bulgaria
People from Bansko
Sportspeople from Blagoevgrad Province
20th-century Bulgarian people
21st-century Bulgarian people